Minety and Ashton Keynes railway station serving the village of Minety in Wiltshire, England, was opened in 1841 on the former Cheltenham and Great Western Union Railway line from Gloucester to Swindon; it was originally called just Minety.

The Cheltenham and Great Western Union and the South Wales lines were both later absorbed by the Great Western Railway, which provided the train services on the line. In 1905 the station was renamed Minety & Ashton Keynes. In 1948 the Great Western Railway was nationalised and the station thereafter was owned by British Rail. Although the line remains open the station closed in November 1964 and has been demolished, except for parts of the platforms.

Originally built as dual track, British Rail reduced the line between Kemble and Swindon to single track in 1968. Network Rail investigated the options for reinstating the second track, along with the estimated cost (see Golden Valley Line). In the 2011 Budget the Government announced that funding for the redoubling was to be provided and the work was completed in August 2014.

References

External links
Minety and Ashton Keynes Station on navigable 1948 O.S. map

Disused railway stations in Wiltshire
Former Great Western Railway stations
Railway stations in Great Britain opened in 1841
Railway stations in Great Britain closed in 1964
Beeching closures in England